Brian Xanders (born April 10, 1971) is an American football executive and former Florida State football player.  He is the former general manager for the Denver Broncos of the National Football League (NFL), and currently is a Senior Personnel Executive / Coaching Assistant for the NFL's Los Angeles Rams.

The 2022 season marks his 29th year in the NFL working in a variety of player personnel, scouting, football operations and coaching staff roles during his time at four teams (Los Angeles, Detroit, Denver and Atlanta). He has direct experience in player evaluations with the last 26 NFL Draft classes and 21 free agency periods.

Los Angeles Rams

For the Rams, Xanders provides assistance in a multi-dimensional role blending the player personnel department and the coaching staff —— college, pro, systems, video, coaching research, game management strategy and 'next gen' innovations.

From 2017 to 2021, he has assisted with multiple talent acquisitions, ranking 1st in pro personnel (AV) and 7th in college scouting (AV). During those five years, the Rams have won the Super Bowl, made another appearance, won three NFC West titles and generated a 62-29 record (2nd). He has also spearheaded 'continual evolution' installations, including evaluations, scouting processes, CFA committees, video integration and football systems.

For the Coaching Staff, he has supported in-game recommendations for game management, strategic decisions, timeouts, challenges, 4th downs, end of half procedures and NFL rules. On a weekly basis, he breaks down opponents using Telemetry and other data sources to find tactical indicators for the coaching staff.

Detroit Lions

At the Detroit Lions, the 4-year player personnel turnover in Detroit yielded the 3rd best era in Lions’ history, since 1930 (34 wins). He worked to improve player personnel communication and data flow, by rebuilding all of the Lions' college and pro systems. Xanders was directly involved with successful talent acquisitions, including WR/Marvin Jones, DS/Glover Quin, K/Matt Prater, DE/Ezekiel Ansah, DC/Darius Slay, DE/Kerry Hyder and ST/Jamal Agnew. The four years of acquisitions ranked 19th in pro personnel (AV) and 11th in college scouting (AV).

Denver Broncos

During his tenure as the Broncos’ General Manager, he engineered the personnel transformation where 90 percent of the team's roster was overhauled after the 2008 NFL season. This four-year player personnel foundation in Denver yielded multiple future division titles and Super Bowl appearances. Those overall acquisitions ranked 2nd in pro personnel (AV) and 6th in college scouting (AV).

The Broncos executed high-producing NFL Draft classes from 2009 to 2012, which became the second highest compensated draft classes in NFL history from 2012 to 2016 ($920M). There were 22 primary starters (1+ year) on NFL teams from those draft classes, including six Pro Bowl players (21 appearances), with 12 All Pro designations ~

§ LB/Von Miller [2011 - 1st] 11-year starter, 8 Pro Bowls, 7 NFL All-Pro, NFL All-Decade Team, Super Bowl MVP, Defensive Rookie of the Year, 115 Sacks, 26 FF's

§ DC/Chris Harris [2011 - CFA] 11-year starter, 4 Pro Bowls, 3 NFL All-Pro, NFL All-Decade Team, All-Rookie Team, 21 INT, 90 PBU's

§ WR/Demaryius Thomas [2010 - 1st] 7-year starter, 5 Pro Bowls, 2 NFL All-Pro, 63 TD's

§ TE/Julius Thomas [2011 - 4th] 5-year starter, 2 Pro Bowls, 36 TD's, 226 Receptions

§ DT/Malik Jackson [2012 - 5th] 10-year starter, 1 Pro Bowl, 36 Sacks, 58 TFL's

§ OG/Zane Beadles [2010 - 2nd] 9-year starter, 1 Pro Bowl, 137 Games Played

§ DT/Derek Wolfe [2012 - 2nd] 8-year starter, 120 games played, 33 Sacks, 55 TFL's

§ LB/Danny Trevathan [2012 - 6th] 10-year starter, 700+ tackles, 27 TFL's, 39 PBU's

§ OT/Orlando Franklin [2011 - 2nd] 7-year starter, 46 AV

§ WR/Eric Decker [2010 - 3rd] 6-year starter, 440 receptions, 53 TD's

§ DE/Robert Ayers [2009 - 1st] 4-year starter, 35 Sacks, 51 TFL's, 120 Games Played

§ TE/Virgil Green [2011 - 7th] 10-year starter, 137 Games Played, 11.0 per reception

§ FS/Rahim Moore [2011 - 2nd] 5-year starter, 64 Games Played, 9 INT's

§ DC/Perrish Cox [2010 - 5th] 4-year starter, 82 Games Played, 10 INT's, 50 PBU's

§ OC/J.D. Walton [2010 - 3rd] 4-year starter, 56 Games Played, 22 AV

§ RB/Knowshon Moreno [2009 - 1st] 5-year starter, 3,600 Yards Rushing, 1,400 Yards Receiving

§ 6 players with 1-year as core starter

During 2009 to 2012, there were also eight other veteran Pro Bowl players (20 appearances) who were signed or extended during his tenure, with 10 All Pro designations (production at the Broncos, after signing) ~

§ QB Peyton Manning [FA, 2012-15] Super Bowl Champion, 2 AFC Championships, NFL MVP, 2 All Pro, 3 Pro Bowls, 140 TD's

§ SS Brian Dawkins [UFA, 2009-11] All Pro, 2 Pro Bowls, 22 PBU's and 235 Tackles at ages 36–38

§ CB Champ Bailey [re-signed, 2011] All-Decade Team, All Pro, 4 Pro Bowls

§ OT Ryan Clady [1st round, 2008] 3 All Pro, 3 Pro Bowls

§ DE Elvis Dumervil [re-signed, 2010] All Pro, 3 Pro Bowls, NFL Sacks Leader (2009)

§ WR Brandon Lloyd [FA, 2009-11] All Pro, Pro Bowl, NFL Receiving Yards Leader (2010)

§ WR Brandon Marshall [re-signed, 2010] 3 Pro Bowls, 4,600+ Receiving Yards

§ RB Willis McGahee [FA, 2011] Pro Bowl, 1,920 Rushing Yards and 9 TD's in 2 years

Xanders also supervised the day-to-day operations of the Broncos’ college scouting, pro scouting, labor operations/salary cap, equipment, medical, video, football systems and football operations departments.

He served on the NFL College Advisory, NFL Combine Selection and the NFL Statistics Committees. He was originally hired by Coach Mike Shanahan/Denver Broncos as Assistant General Manager in 2008.

Atlanta Falcons

Before joining the Broncos, he worked 14 seasons (1994-2008) with the Atlanta Falcons in various scouting, player personnel, football operations, coaching staff (defense/offense/ST) and technology/systems roles. Xanders was a member of the Falcons’ defensive coaching staff on their 1998 team that became the first in franchise history to earn a Super Bowl berth (XXXIII).

He was selected by the Falcons to attend Stanford University's NFL Program for Managers in 2005, he has given presentations at several universities on NFL player personnel issues.

Florida State University

A former linebacker who played for Bobby Bowden at Florida State University from 1989 to 1992, Xanders was a member of four bowl-winning teams with the Seminoles that had a 42-7 combined record.

He was an All-Atlantic Coast Conference academic team selection and graduated from FSU with a master's degree in Business Administration (MBA) and a bachelor's degree in Business Management.

Personal life

Xanders resides with his wife and two children in Ponte Vedra Beach, Florida. He and his family participate in Habitat for Humanity charities, Homes for the Holidays, and Warrick Dunn Charities.

References

External links

 Detroit Lions bio

1971 births
Living people
Businesspeople from Pennsylvania
Denver Broncos executives
Los Angeles Rams executives
American football linebackers
Atlanta Falcons executives
Detroit Lions executives
Florida State Seminoles football players
National Football League general managers
People from East Stroudsburg, Pennsylvania
Players of American football from Pennsylvania